Pleopeltis murorum is a species of fern in the family Polypodiaceae. It is native to parts of Central and Southern America (Costa Rica, Hispaniola, Colombia, Venezuela and Ecuador). Under the synonym Polypodium mixtum, it was regarded as endemic to Ecuador and threatened by habitat loss.

References

Polypodiaceae
Flora of Colombia
Flora of Costa Rica
Flora of Ecuador
Flora of Haiti
Flora of the Dominican Republic
Flora of Venezuela
Taxonomy articles created by Polbot
Taxobox binomials not recognized by IUCN 
Flora without expected TNC conservation status